Local elections were held in Zamboanga City on May 9, 2016, within the Philippine general election. The voters elected for the elective local posts in the city: the mayor, vice mayor, and eight councilors per district.

Retiring and term-limited elective officials
 Luis Biel III, incumbent District I councilor, term-limited in 2016
 Cesar Jimenez, Jr., incumbent District I councilor, term-limited in 2016
 Melchor Sadain, incumbent District I councilor, term-limited in 2016
 Rogelio Valesco, Jr., incumbent District I councilor, term-limited in 2016
 Eduardo Saavedra, incumbent District II councilor, term-limited in 2016

Results
The candidates for district representative, mayor, and vice mayor, with the highest number of votes, wins the seat; they are voted separately, therefore they may be of different parties when elected.

House of Representatives election

1st District
Incumbent Congressman Celso Lobregat is running for reelection.

2nd District
District II Representative Lilia Macrohon-Nuño is running for reelection.

Mayoral elections
Incumbent Mayor Maria Isabelle Climaco Salazar is running for reelection.

Vice-mayoral elections
Incumbent Vice Mayor Cesar Iturralde is running for reelection. Although he considered to run for Congress representing District 2, Iturrakde decided to back down in attempt to prevent a show-off between incumbent Mayor Beng Climaco and incumbent District 1 Congressman Celso Lobregat.

City Council elections
Each of Zamboanga City's two legislative districts elects eight councilors to the City Council. The eight candidates with the highest number of votes wins the seats per district.

1st District

|-bgcolor=black
|colspan=6|

2nd District

|-bgcolor=black
|colspan=6|

See also
Philippine House of Representatives elections in the Zamboanga Peninsula, 2016
2016 Philippine general election

References

External links
Official website of the Commission on Elections
 Official website of National Movement for Free Elections (NAMFREL)
Official website of the Parish Pastoral Council for Responsible Voting (PPCRV)

2016 Philippine local elections
Elections in Zamboanga City